The Hare–Hawes–Cutting Act passed to authors Congress Butler B. Hare, Senator Harry B. Hawes and Senator Bronson M. Cutting. (ch. 11, enacted January 17, 1933) The Hare–Hawes–Cutting Act was the first US law passed setting a process and a date for the Philippines to gain independence from the United States. It was the result of the OsRox Mission led by Sergio Osmeña and Manuel Roxas.  The law promised Philippine independence after 10 years, but reserved several military and naval bases for the United States, as well as imposed tariffs and quotas on Philippine imports.

By 1932, two main groups supported a law outlining the specifics of Philippine independence: Great Depression-era American farmers competing against tariff-free Filipino sugar and coconut oil; and Filipinos seeking Philippine independence.  The Hare–Hawes–Cutting Act was authored by South Carolina Representative Butler Hare, Missouri Senator Harry Bartow Hawes and New Mexico Senator Bronson M. Cutting. It passed by the United States Congress in December 1932, but was vetoed by U.S. President Herbert Hoover.  Congress overrode the veto on January 17, 1933.  The Philippine Senate was required to ratify the law. With leaders such as Manuel L. Quezon opposing it, the Philippine Senate rejected the bill.

Subsequently, a new bill, the Tydings–McDuffie Act of 1934, was passed by the United States Government. This was ratified by the Philippine Senate and resulted in the 1935 Philippine Constitution, the establishment of the Philippine Commonwealth and ultimately Philippine independence on July 4, 1946.

See also
 Political history of the Philippines
 History of the Philippines
 Philippine Organic Act (1902)
 Jones Law (Philippines) or the Philippines Autonomy Act (1916)

References

History of the Philippines (1898–1946)
1932 in American law
United States federal territory and statehood legislation